Sylvain Rabary (born 29 August 1961) is a Malagasy judoka. He competed in the men's half-lightweight event at the 1980 Summer Olympics.

References

1961 births
Living people
Malagasy male judoka
Olympic judoka of Madagascar
Judoka at the 1980 Summer Olympics
Place of birth missing (living people)